The Netherlands has participated in the biennial classical music competition Eurovision Young Musicians 12 times since its debut in 1984, winning the contest that year and in 1990. The Netherlands did not take part between 1992 and 1998, and again from 2016. The Netherlands hosted the contest in 1988.

Participation overview

Hostings

See also
Netherlands in the Eurovision Song Contest
Netherlands in the Eurovision Dance Contest
Netherlands in the Junior Eurovision Song Contest

References

External links
 Eurovision Young Musicians

Countries in the Eurovision Young Musicians